Dan Constantin Irimiciuc (born 9 May 1949) is a retired Romanian sabre fencer. He won team silver medals at the 1974 and 1977 World Championships, and team bronze medals at the 1975 World Championships  and 1976 Olympics. He was awarded the Romanian Order of "Sports Merit" in 1974 (Class III) and 1976 (Class I).

References

External links
 

1949 births
Living people
Romanian male sabre fencers
Olympic fencers of Romania
Fencers at the 1972 Summer Olympics
Fencers at the 1976 Summer Olympics
Olympic bronze medalists for Romania
Olympic medalists in fencing
Sportspeople from Iași
Medalists at the 1976 Summer Olympics
Universiade medalists in fencing
Universiade bronze medalists for Romania
Medalists at the 1973 Summer Universiade
Medalists at the 1977 Summer Universiade
20th-century Romanian people
21st-century Romanian people